Satendra Nandan is an Indian academic, writer, and politician. He is a member of the Institution of Engineers (India), and is also host of some talk shows.

Early life 
Nandan was born in Uttar Pradesh, India. After completing his secondary education he studied in Delhi, from where he obtained his degree in engineering. After teaching in various schools in India, he joined the University of the South Pacific in Suva, Fiji in 1969. As a young academic in India, he taught at the all-boys' boarding school The Doon School in Dehradun.

Political life 
He entered in politics in Fiji as a member. As the National Federation Party began to fragment, he joined politics. He won the election on the Fiji Labour Party ticket and was the Minister of Health, Social Welfare and Women's Affairs on the month-long Bavadra Government. He served as National Spokesperson for the party.

Later life 

After the coup of 1987, he migrated to Australia and took up a position at the Australian National University in Canberra. At present he is a professor of literature and director of the Centre for Writing. He has also provided his support to newly established journals at the University of Fiji by taking up the position of professor of humanities and the arts.

Publications

References

Indo-Fijian writers
Fiji Labour Party politicians
Indian members of the House of Representatives (Fiji)
1939 births
Living people
The Doon School faculty
National Federation Party politicians
Health ministers of Fiji
Academic staff of the University of the South Pacific
Academic staff of the University of Fiji
Academic staff of the Australian National University